Jodie Rimmer (born 1974) is a New Zealand voice and performer actress best known for starring on Young Hercules, as Lilith. Her work includes Xena: Warrior Princess,  Channelling Baby, The Strip, and In My Father's Den.

Biography
Rimmer was educated at Glenfield College on Auckland's North Shore.

Awards
In 2005, Rimmer won in the Performance by an Actress in a Supporting Role category at the New Zealand Screen Awards for her role in the film In My Father's Den (2004).

Filmography

Film

Television

References

External links

Living people
1974 births
New Zealand television actresses
New Zealand soap opera actresses
People from Auckland
20th-century New Zealand actresses
21st-century New Zealand actresses
People educated at Glenfield College